London by Night is a 1937 American murder mystery film directed by Wilhelm Thiele and starring George Murphy, Rita Johnson and Virginia Field. It marked the screen debut of Johnson who while shooting the film also unsuccessfully tested to replace Jean Harlow in Saratoga. Gossip columnist Louella Parsons drew attention to her as a rising star. It was based on an unproduced play The Umbrella by British writer William Matthew Scott.

Plot
A London-based newspaperman is about to head for Paris for his first vacation in three years when he becomes embroiled by the murder of a shopkeeper in the square where he lives, followed shortly afterwards by the shooting of a police constable. 

Working alongside Inspector Jefferson of Scotland Yard he encounters a spirited socialite when he accosts her family's butler whom he wrongly suspects is the killer. Public alarm rises further when a barmaid at a nearby pub is also killed.

Reception
According to MGM records the movie earned $187,000 in the US and Canada and $134,000 elsewhere, resulting in a loss of $3,000.

Cast

 George Murphy as 	Michael Denis
 Rita Johnson as Patricia Herrick
 Virginia Field as 	Bessie
 Leo G. Carroll as Correy
 George Zucco as 	Inspector Jefferson
 Montagu Love as Sir Arthur Herrick
 Eddie Quillan as 	Bill
 Leonard Mudie as 	Squires
 J.M. Kerrigan as Tims
 Neil Fitzgerald as 	Inspector Sleet
 Harry Stubbs as 	Postman
 Ivan F. Simpson as Burroughs
 Frank Baker as 	Walker 
 Leyland Hodgson as 	Maddow
 Robert Adair as Bobby 
 Harry Allen as Glazer
 Colin Kenny as Scotland Yard Detective 
 William Bailey as Scotland Yard Detective

References

Bibliography
 Wagner, Laura. Hollywood's Hard-Luck Ladies: 23 Actresses Who Suffered Early Deaths, Accidents, Missteps, Illnesses and Tragedies. McFarland, 2020.

External links
 
 
 
 

1937 mystery films
1937 films
American mystery films
American black-and-white films
1930s English-language films
American films based on plays
Films directed by Wilhelm Thiele
Metro-Goldwyn-Mayer films
Films set in London
1930s American films